Goddess of Love may refer to:

 Female deities of love in various cultures
 Goddess of Love (album), an album by Phyllis Hyman
 Goddess of Love (film), a 1988 American fantasy film
 "Goddess of Love", a song by Orchestral Manoeuvres in the Dark from the album The Pacific Age
 "Goddess of Love", single Bryan Ferry discography 2002

See also

 God of Love